The 1964 winners of the Torneo di Viareggio (in English, the Viareggio Tournament, officially the Viareggio Cup World Football Tournament Coppa Carnevale), the annual youth football tournament held in Viareggio, Tuscany, are listed below.

Format

The 16 teams are organized in knockout rounds. The round of 16 are played in two-legs, while the rest of the rounds are single tie.

Participating teams

Italian teams

  Bologna
  Fiorentina
  Genoa
  Inter Milan
  Juventus
  Milan
  Roma
  Sampdoria

European teams

  Austria Wien
  Dukla Praha
  Toulon
  Ferencváros
  Partizan Beograd
  Rijeka
  Daring
  Augsburg

Tournament fixtures

Champions

Footnotes

External links
 Official Site (Italian)
 Results on RSSSF.com

1964
1963–64 in Italian football
1963–64 in Yugoslav football
1963–64 in Hungarian football
1963–64 in German football
1963–64 in Czechoslovak football
1963–64 in French football
1963–64 in Belgian football
1963–64 in Austrian football